State Route 161 (SR 161) is a north–south state highway located entirely in Robertson County in Middle Tennessee. Its northern terminus is at the Kentucky state line, where it becomes Kentucky Route 102 (KY 102).

Route description

SR 161 begins in Springfield at an intersection with US 431/SR 65 north of downtown in an industrial area. The highway then leaves Springfield and continues northwest through farmland. It passes through Barren Plains, where it has a Y-Intersection with SR 25. SR 161 continues northwest to cross a bridge over the Red River before coming to the Kentucky state line, where SR 161 becomes Kentucky Route 102.

Major intersections

References 

161
161